Francis Mourey (born 8 December 1980) is a French former professional cyclo-cross and road bicycle racer, who rode professionally between 2004 and 2017.

He won the 2013 Tro-Bro Léon, leading home an  clean sweep of the podium as teammates Johan Le Bon and Anthony Geslin followed him across the finish line. In October 2015 Mourey announced that he would leave FDJ and join  for the 2016 season, reuniting him with former FDJ teammates Pierrick Fédrigo, Yauheni Hutarovich and Arnaud Gérard.

Major results

2000
 7th Manx Trophy
2004
 1st Stage 2 Route du Sud
2005
 1st  National Cyclo-cross Championships
2006
 2nd National Cyclo-cross Championships
 3rd  UCI Cyclo-cross World Championships
2007
 1st  National Cyclo-cross Championships
 6th Tour du Doubs
2008
 1st  National Cyclo-cross Championships
 7th Overall Tour du Limousin
2009
 1st  National Cyclo-cross Championships
2010
 1st  National Cyclo-cross Championships
2011
 1st  National Cyclo-cross Championships
2013
 1st  National Cyclo-cross Championships
 1st Tro-Bro Léon
 1st Stage 5 Circuit de la Sarthe
 5th Cholet-Pays de Loire
2014
 1st  National Cyclo-cross Championships
2015
 8th Tro-Bro Léon

References

External links 

Francis Mourey photos
Francis Mourey photo ebook

French male cyclists
1980 births
Living people
Sportspeople from Doubs
Cyclo-cross cyclists
Cyclists from Bourgogne-Franche-Comté
20th-century French people
21st-century French people